Semigyalecta is a genus of lichenized fungi in the family Gyalectaceae. It is a monotypic genus, containing the single species Semigyalecta paradoxa, described as new to science in 1921 by Finnish lichenologist Edvard August Vainio.

References

Lichen genera
Gyalectales
Gyalectales genera
Taxa named by Edvard August Vainio
Taxa described in 1921